Tököl is a town in Pest County, Hungary.

Demography 
The majority of residents are Hungarians, with a minority of Bunjevci.

Hungarian Uprising
An Budapest-Tököl airfield (47 20 35 N / 18 59 20 E) was built during World War II, which was to become a Soviet military base. During the Hungarian Uprising, Pál Maléter, as Defence Minister for the Imre Nagy government, went to negotiate with the Soviet military presence and was arrested during the negotiations.

Notable residents
Pál Hoffman, politician
István Szilágyi, handball player

External links 
 Street map 

Populated places in Pest County
Croatian communities in Hungary
Serb communities in Hungary